Prairie Rose may refer to:

A number of bushy flowering plants:
Rosa arkansana (wild prairie rose)
Rosa blanda (smooth rose)
Rosa setigera (climbing rose)
Rosa virginiana (Virginia rose)

Other things:
Prairie Rose, North Dakota
Prairie Rose State Games, a North Dakota athletic event
Rural Municipality of Prairie Rose No. 309, Saskatchewan, Canada
 "Prairie Rose", a song by Roxy Music on the 1974 album Country Life (Roxy Music album)